Sea spiders are marine arthropods of the order Pantopoda ( ‘all feet’), belonging to the class Pycnogonida, hence they are also called pycnogonids (named after Pycnogonum, the type genus; with the suffix ). They are cosmopolitan, found in oceans around the world. Most are toward the smaller end of this range in relatively shallow depths; however, they can grow to be quite large in Antarctic and deep waters.

Although "sea spiders" are not true spiders, nor even arachnids, their traditional classification as chelicerates would place them closer to true spiders than to other well-known arthropod groups, such as insects or crustaceans, if correct. This is disputed, however, as genetic evidence suggests they may be a sister group to all other living arthropods.

Description

Sea spiders have long legs in contrast to a small body size. The number of walking legs is usually eight (four pairs), but the family Pycnogonidae includes species with five pairs, and the families Colossendeidae and Nymphonidae include species with both five and six pairs. There are nine polymerous (i.e., extra-legged) species: seven species distributed among four genera (Decolopoda, Pentacolossendeis, Pentapycnon, and Pentanymphon) with five leg pairs and two species in two genera (Dodecolopoda and Sexanymphon) with six leg pairs. Pycnogonids do not require a traditional respiratory system. Instead, gasses are absorbed by the legs and transferred through the body by diffusion. A proboscis allows them to suck nutrients from soft-bodied invertebrates, and their digestive tract has diverticula extending into the legs.

Certain pycnogonids are so small that each of their very tiny muscles consists of a single cell, surrounded by connective tissue. The anterior region (cephalon) consists of the proboscis, which has fairly limited dorsoventral and lateral movement, the ocular tubercle with eyes, and up to four pairs of appendages. The first of these are the chelifores, followed by the palps, the s, which are used for cleaning themselves and caring for eggs and young as well as courtship, and the first pair of walking legs. Nymphonidae is the only family where both the chelifores and the palps are functional. In the others the chelifores or palps, or both, are reduced or absent. In some families, also the ovigers can be reduced or missing in females, but are always present in males. In those species that lack chelifores and palps, the proboscis is well developed and flexible, often equipped with numerous sensory bristles and strong rasping ridges around the mouth. The last segment includes the anus and tubercle, which projects dorsally.

In total, pycnogonids have four to six pairs of legs for walking. A cephalothorax and a much smaller unsegmented abdomen make up the extremely reduced body of the pycnogonid, which has up to two pairs of dorsally located simple eyes on its non-calcareous exoskeleton, though sometimes the eyes can be missing, especially among species living in the deep oceans. The abdomen does not have any appendages, and in most species it is reduced and almost vestigial. The organs of this chelicerate extend throughout many appendages because its body is too small to accommodate all of them alone.

The morphology of the sea spider creates an efficient surface area-to-volume ratio for respiration to occur through direct diffusion. Oxygen is absorbed by the legs and is transported via the hemolymph to the rest of the body. The most recent research seems to indicate that waste leaves the body through the digestive tract or is lost during a moult. The small, long, thin pycnogonid heart beats vigorously at 90 to 180 beats per minute, creating substantial blood pressure. The beating of the sea spider heart drives circulation in the trunk and in the part of the legs closest to the trunk, but is not important for the circulation in the rest of the legs. Hemolymph circulation in the legs is mostly driven by the peristaltic movement in the part of the gut that extends into every leg, a process called gut peristalsis. These creatures possess an open circulatory system as well as a nervous system consisting of a brain which is connected to two ventral nerve cords, which in turn connect to specific nerves.

Reproduction and development
All pycnogonid species have separate sexes, except for one species that is hermaphroditic. Females possess a pair of ovaries, while males possess a pair of testes located dorsally in relation to the digestive tract. Reproduction involves external fertilisation after "a brief courtship". Only males care for laid eggs and young.

The larva has a blind gut and the body consists of a head and its three pairs of cephalic appendages only: the chelifores, palps and s. The abdomen and the thorax with its thoracic appendages develop later. One theory is that this reflects how a common ancestor of all arthropods evolved; starting its life as a small animal with a pair of appendages used for feeding and two pairs used for locomotion, while new segments and segmental appendages were gradually added as it was growing.

At least four types of larvae have been described: the typical protonymphon larva, the encysted larva, the atypical protonymphon larva, and the attaching larva. The typical protonymphon larva is most common, is free living and gradually turns into an adult. The encysted larva is a parasite that hatches from the egg and finds a host in the shape of a polyp colony where it burrows into and turns into a cyst, and will not leave the host before it has turned into a young juvenile.

Little is known about the development of the atypical protonymphon larva. The adults are free living, while the larvae and the juveniles are living on or inside temporary hosts such as polychaetes and clams. When the attaching larva hatches it still looks like an embryo, and immediately attaches itself to the ous legs of the father, where it will stay until it has turned into a small and young juvenile with two or three pairs of walking legs ready for a free-living existence.

Distribution and ecology

These animals live in many different parts of the world, from Australia, New Zealand, and the Pacific coast of the United States, to the Mediterranean Sea and the Caribbean Sea, to the north and south poles. Pycnogonids are well camouflaged beneath the rocks and among the algae that are found along shorelines.

Sea spiders either walk along the bottom with their stilt-like legs or swim just above it using an umbrella pulsing motion. Sea spiders are mostly carnivorous predators or scavengers that feed on cnidarians, sponges, polychaetes, and bryozoans. Although they can feed by inserting their proboscis into sea anemones, which are much larger, most sea anemones survive this ordeal, making the sea spider a parasite rather than a predator of anemones.

Classification
The class Pycnogonida comprises over 1,300 species, which are normally split into eighty-six genera. The correct taxonomy within the group is uncertain, and it appears that no agreed list of orders exists. All families are considered part of the single order Pantopoda.

Sea spiders have long been considered to belong to the Chelicerata, together with horseshoe crabs, and the Arachnida, which includes spiders, mites, ticks, scorpions, and harvestmen, among other, lesser-known orders.

A competing theory proposes that pycnogonida belong to their own lineage, distinct from chelicerates, crustaceans, myriapods, or insects. This theory contends that the sea spider's chelifores, which are unique among extant arthropods, are not in any way homologous to the chelicerae in real chelicerates, as was previously supposed. Instead of developing from the deutocerebrum, they can be traced to the protocerebrum, the anterior part of the arthropod brain and found in the first head segment that in all other arthropods give rise to the eyes only. This is not found anywhere else among arthropods, except in some fossil forms like Anomalocaris, indicating that the Pycnogonida may be a sister group to all other living arthropods, the latter having evolved from some ancestor that had lost the protocerebral appendages. If this is confirmed, it would mean the sea spiders are the last surviving (and highly modified) members of an ancient stem group of arthropods that lived in Cambrian oceans. However, a subsequent study using Hox gene expression patterns consistent with a developmental homology between chelicerates and chelifores, with chelifores innervated from a deuterocerebrum that has been rotated forwards; thus, the protocerebral Great Appendage clade does not include the Pycnogonida.

Recent work places the Pycnogonida outside the Arachnomorpha as basal Euarthropoda, or inside Chelicerata (based on the chelifore-chelicera putative homology).

Group taxonomy
According to the World Register of Marine Species, the order Pantopoda is subdivided as follows:

suborder Eupantopodida
including the following superfamilies:
Ascorhynchoidea Pocock, 1904
Colossendeidoidea Hoek, 1881
Nymphonoidea Pocock, 1904
Phoxichilidoidea Sars, 1891
Pycnogonoidea Pocock, 1904
Rhynchothoracoidea Fry, 1978
suborder Stiripasterida Fry, 1978 including the following family:
Austrodecidae Stock, 1954
suborder incertae sedis, including the following extinct genera:
Flagellopantopus Poschmann & Dunlop, 2005 †
Palaeothea Bergstrom, Sturmer & Winter, 1980 †
family Pantopoda incertae sedis, including the following genera:
Alcynous Costa, 1861 (nomen dubium)
Foxichilus Costa, 1836 (nomen dubium)
Oiceobathys Hesse, 1867 (nomen dubium)
Oomerus Hesse, 1874 (nomen dubium)
Paritoca Philippi, 1842 (nomen dubium)
Pephredro Goodsir, 1842 (nomen dubium)
Phanodemus Costa, 1836 (nomen dubium)
Platychelus Costa, 1861 (nomen dubium)

This taxonomic classification replaces the older version in which Pantopoda is subdivided into families as follows:
Ammotheidae
Austrodecidae
Callipallenidae
Colossendeidae
Endeididae
Nymphonidae
Pallenopsidae
Phoxichilidiidae
Pycnogonidae
Rhynchothoracidae

Fossil record
Although the fossil record of pycnogonids is scant, it is clear that they once possessed a coelom, but it was later lost, and that the group is very old.

The earliest fossils are known from the Cambrian 'Orsten' of Sweden, the Silurian Coalbrookdale Formation of England and the Devonian Hunsrück Slate of Germany. Some of these specimens are significant in that they possess a longer 'trunk' behind the abdomen and in two fossils the body ends in a tail; something never seen in living sea spiders.

In 2013, the first fossil pycnogonid found within an Ordovician deposit was reported from William Lake in  Manitoba.

In 2007, remarkably well preserved fossils were exposed in fossil beds at La Voulte-sur-Rhône, south of Lyon in south-eastern France. Researchers from the University of Lyon discovered about 70 fossils from three distinct species in the 160-million-year-old Jurassic La Voulte . The find will help fill in an enormous gap in the history of these creatures.

References

External links 

 
 
 
PycnoBase: World list of Pycnogonida
Introduction to the Pycnogonida
Images of Pycnogonida, and Pycnogonids in literature
Bibliography (compiled by Franz Krapp)

 
Extant Cambrian first appearances
Taxa named by Carl Eduard Adolph Gerstaecker